Smart Mobs: The Next Social Revolution is a book by Howard Rheingold  dealing with the social, economic and political changes implicated by developing technology.  The book covers subjects from text-messaging culture to wireless Internet developments to the impact of the web on the marketplace.  The author highlights the many ways in which technology alters and impacts the way in which people live and think.

See also
 Collective intelligence

References

External links
SmartMobs.com is Rheingold's home page.

Technology books
Sociology books
Basic Books books
2002 non-fiction books